Gikor may refer to:

 "Gikor", a short story by Hovhannes Tumanyan
 Gikor (1934 film), an Armenian melodrama film
 Gikor (1982 film), an Armenian drama film